The 1980 Wisconsin Badgers football team was an American football team that represented the University of Wisconsin–Madison in the 1980 Big Ten Conference football season. In their third season under head coach Dave McClain, the Badgers finished in a tie for sixth place in the Big Ten Conference (Big Ten), compiled a 4–7 record (3–5 against Big Ten opponents), and were outscored by their opponents by a combined total of 211 to 138. The team played its home games in Camp Randall Stadium in Madison, Wisconsin.

The team's statistical leaders included John Josten with 622 passing yards, John Williams with 526 rushing yards, Tim Stracka with 462 receiving yards, and Jess Cole with 30 points. Tim Stracka also ranked sixth in the Big Ten with 16.5 yards per reception.

Schedule

Roster

Game summaries

Purdue
On September 13, Wisconsin opened its season with a 12–6 loss to #20 Purdue. Mark Herrmann of Purdue passed for 347 yards, including 200 yards to wide receiver Bart Burrell, but the Boilermakers were unable to score a touchdown, settling for four field goals.

BYU
On September 20, Wisconsin lost to BYU, 28–3, in Madison. BYU's Jim McMahon, winner of the 1981 Davey O'Brien Award and Sammy Baugh Trophy, passed for 337 yards and three touchdowns and ran for a fourth touchdown.

at UCLA
On September 27, Wisconsin lost to UCLA (AP No. 16), 35–7, at the Rose Bowl in Pasadena. UCLA's freshman running back Kevin Nelson rushed for 123 yards and a touchdown on 20 carries and also caught three passes for 36 yards. John Williams rushed for 101 yards for Wisconsin, but the Badgers were unable to score.

San Diego State
On October 4, Wisconsin defeated San Diego State, 35–12, in Madison. After failing to score a touchdown in its first three games, Wisconsin took a 21–0 lead over San Diego State in the second quarter. Defensive end Dave Ahrens had three sacks, and the Aztecs were held to minus four net rushing yards.

at Indiana
On October 11, Indiana defeated Wisconsin, 24–0, in front of a homecoming crowd of 51,029 at Memorial Stadium in Bloomington. Indiana's defense held Wisconsin to 204 yards of total offense (only 65 in the second half) and had seven tackles for loss. Quarterback Tim Clifford completed 17 of 25 passes for 186 yards and two touchdowns.

at Michigan State
On October 18, Wisconsin defeated Michigan State, 17–7, at Spartan Stadium in East Lansing. Wisconsin fullback Dave Mohapp rushed for 138 yards and scored a touchdown.  Wisconsin's second touchdown followed a fumbled punt that was recovered in the end zone by Mark Subach.

Ohio State
On October 25, Wisconsin lost to #10 Ohio State, 21–0, in Madison. Wisconsin's defense held Art Schlichter to 89 passing yards, but Ohio State scored touchdowns after two Wisconsin fumbles and an interception. After the game, Wisconsin coach Dave McClain said, "You can't make that many mistakes. I've never been so frustrated with the mistakes."

at Iowa
On November 1, Wisconsin lost to Iowa, 22–13, in Iowa City. In his first game as Iowa's starting quarterback, Pete Gales completed nine of 22 passes for 161 yards and rushed for 41 yards. One of Gales' completions was good for 54 yards and a touchdown to Keith Chappelle. Iowa scored another touchdown when Iowa linebacker Andre Tippett forced a fumble by Wisconsin quarterback John Josten, and Mark Bortz recovered the ball in the end zone.

Michigan

On November 8, Wisconsin lost to #8 Michigan, 24–0, in Madison. Michigan struggled early, failing to earn a first down on its first six possessions. Anthony Carter caught a touchdown pass just before halftime to set a Michigan school record for touchdown receptions in a single season. As Michigan drove deep into Wisconsin territory, noise from the Wisconsin student section made it difficult for Michigan to call its signals. When fans refused to reduce the noise, the officials struck all three Wisconsin timeouts and then assessed two delay of game penalties, giving Michigan a first down at the one-yard line. Butch Woolfolk then scored on a one-yard run

at Northwestern
On November 15, Wisconsin defeated Northwestern, 39–19, in Evanston. Northwestern's Mike Kerrigan passed for 237 yards in the loss. The Wildcats finished the season 0–11 and in the midst of a 34-game losing streak that began on September 22, 1979, and ended on September 25, 1982

Minnesota

On November 22, in the annual battle for Paul Bunyan' Axe, Wisconsin defeated Minnesota, 25–7, at Camp Randall Stadium in Madison. Wisconsin quarterback, Jess Cole, in his second start, scored four touchdowns. Cole started in place of John Josten, who had re-injured an ankle the previous week versus Northwestern.

1981 NFL Draft

References

Wisconsin
Wisconsin Badgers football seasons
Wisconsin Badgers football